= Mukesh Singh Gehlot =

Indian bodybuilder and powerlifter (born 1978)

- Professional bodybuilder

Personal info
- Nickname: Guru Ji
- Born: 1 May 1978 (age 48); New Delhi, India

Best statistics
- Height: 175

Professional (Pro) career
- Best win: Mr. India 2008, 2009, 2010, and 2012, Gold-Olympia 2017 Pro Power Lifting Division

Mukesh Singh Gahlot (born 1 May 1978) is an Indian bodybuilder and powerlifter. He holds the national record of winning Mr. India title 4 times, in 2008, 2009, 2010, and 2012.

== Achievements ==
- British Open Powerlifting Championship 2012 - Two gold medals
- World Powerlifting Championship
- Asian Bodybuilding Championship, 2012 - Silver medal
- Olympia, 2018 Pro Powerlifting Division- Bronze Medal
- Olympia, 2017 Pro Powerlifting Division- Gold Medal
- Mr. India 2008, 2009, 2010, 2012
- World Powerlifting Championship England 2016 - Gold Medal
